The Chinese FA Cup (abbreviated as CFA Cup) is the national knockout cup competition in China organized by the Chinese Football Association. Its current holders are Shandong Taishan, having beaten Zhejiang in 2022 for a record eighth title.

History
It was started as Chinese National Football Championship in 1956. The tournament was reorganized after the Culture Revolution and used name Chinese FA Cup for the first time in 1984. It was scrapped for the 6th National Games of China in 1987. It was reorganized again as Chinese National Cup Winners' Cup between 1990 and 1992 as the qualification of Asian Cup Winners' Cup.

Its current format started in the 1995 season after professional football league was established in China. It was temporary scrapped in 2007 for Chinese Football Association 2008 Summer Olympic strategy, and made its return when the 2011 Chinese FA Cup was announced after a long hiatus. Amateur teams were first introduced in the 2012 Chinese FA Cup according to the new slogan Game For All.

Cup results

Non-professional club period

Professional club period

aet Won after extra time

Results by team

Awards

Top goalscorer(s)

Most Valuable Player

Best Coach

Fair Play Award

Dark Horse Award

Sponsors

See also
 Football in China
 Chinese Football Association
 Chinese football champions
 Chinese football records
 Chinese Super League
 Chinese Jia-A League
 China League One
 China League Two

References

External links
 Official website 
 Official website of the Chinese Football Association 
 RSSSF.com - China List of Cup Winners
 Chinese FA Cup summary - Soccerway

 
National association football cups
Football cup competitions in China